The structure for the 2015 Rugby Football League reintroduced promotion and relegation between Super League and the Championship which will both include 12 teams each.

At the end of the regular seasons, the two divisions will split into three groups of eight, The Super Eights.

Super League Top Eight
The top 8 teams in Super League carry the points they have earned in the regular season forward and play each other once, home or away. The top four teams will then play each other for a place in the Grand Final.

Super League Bottom Four and Championship Top Four
The bottom four in Super League and top four in the Championship form their own league of 8, with each team's points reset to zero, and play each other once home or away. The top three teams automatically gain a place in Super League. Teams that finish fourth and fifth will play each other in The Million Pound Game to determine who gets the final Super League place.

Championship Bottom Eight
The rest of the Championship will carry the points they earned in the regular season forward and play each other Once (home or away). The top four will then play each other and two teams will play in the Grand Final for the Championship Shield. Two teams will be relegated each year.

References

Super League
Championship (rugby league)
2015 in British sport